Akera bullata  is a species of sea snail (or sea slug), a marine opisthobranch gastropod mollusk in the family Akeridae, a family that is related to the sea hares. This species is the only European  representative of the genus Akera.

Distribution
This species  occurs from Norway to the Canaries,  and also in the Mediterranean.

Ecology
This is a herbivorous bottom dweller (up to 370 m deep), which feeds on seagrasses in the genera Zostera and Posidonia.

Description
The body has a maximum length of about 6 cm. Its color varies from gray  to orange, with white or dark specks. Its fragile and smooth shell is white or brown. This sea hare is not an agile swimmer. It uses its broad parapodia (fleshy protrusions), held together funnelwise above the head, to paddle away when disturbed.

Synonyms
Acera bullata is an orthographic variant with considerable currency.

The NLBIF lists a large number of synonyms in addition to the above; including: Bulla akera (Gmelin, J.F., 1791), Bulla norwegica (Bruguière, J.G., 1789), Bulla canaliculata (Olivi, 1792), Bulla  resiliens (Donovan, E., 1801), Bulla fragilis (Lamarck, J.B.P.A. de, 1822), Akera  flexilis (Brown, 1844), Bulla hanleyi (Adams A. in Sowerby G.B. II, 1850/1855), Eucampe donovani (Leach, W.E., 1852), Bulla elastica (Sandri &  Danilo, 1856), Acera bullata var. nana (Jeffreys, 1867), Acera  elegans (Locard, 1886), Bulla farrani (Norman, 1890), Bulla globosa (Cantraine, F.J., 1840), Akera tenuis (Brusina, S., 1866) and Akera farrani (Winckworth, R., 1932).

References

 Müller, O.F. (1776). Zoologica Danicae Prodromus seu Animalium Daniae et Norvegiae indigenarum characters, nomine, et synonyma imprimis popularium. Havniae. XXXII, 274 pp., page(s): 242

Further reading
Proposed use of the Plenary Powers for the purpose of securing that the name bullata Muller (O. F.), 1776, as published in the combination Akera bullata, shall be the oldest available name for the species currently  so known (Class Gastropoda).
Ecology and taxonomic status of the aplysiomorph Akera bullata in the British Isles.
The marine fauna of the Sizewell area 1:  brackish lagoons.
Akera bullata Mueller O.F., 1792 in the  southeastern Mediterranean (Israel).
Marine invertebrates.
Phylogenetic  analysis of learning-related neuromodulation in molluscan  mechanosensory neurons.
Die Conchylien des Mittelmeers. Band ii. Mollusca cephala.
Hayward, P.J., Wigham, G.D. & N. Yonow, 1990. Mollusca I:  Polyplacophora, Scaphopoda, and Gastropoda. In: The Marine Fauna of the  British Isles and North-West Europe. (ed. P.J. Hayward & J.S.  Ryland). Clarendon Press, Oxford: 628-730.
Poppe, G.T. & Y.  Goto, 1991. European Seashells. Vol. I. 352 pp. Wiesbaden/Verlag Christa  Hemmen.
Seaward, D.R., 1990. Distribution of the marine molluscs  of north west Europe. Nature Conservancy Council.
Sowerby, G.B.,  1859: Illustrated Index of British Shells. London.
Thompson, T.E.,  1988. Molluscs: Benthic Opisthobranchs (Mollusca: Gastropoda). Synopses  of the British fauna (NS), 8: 1-356.

Akeridae
Gastropods described in 1776
Taxa named by Otto Friedrich Müller